The Stanley Cup is an ice hockey championship trophy.

Stanley Cup may also refer to:
 NHL Stanley Cup (Super NES), an ice hockey video game

See also
 Stanley Cup challenge games, the competition format of the Stanley Cup used from 1893 to 1914
 Stanley Cup Finals, the championship series to determine the winner of the Stanley Cup
 Stanley Cup playoffs, the elimination tournament in which the trophy is contested
 Stanley Cup winning players
 "Stanley's Cup", an episode of South Park
 List of Stanley Cup champions
 Sir Arthur Stanley Cup, presented at the first British Grand Prix in 1926